The Shahid Sattari University of Aeronautical Engineering or Air University, is Islamic Republic of Iran Air Force's military academy.

It was established in 1988 by the IRIAF general Mansour Sattari in Tehran, Iran, due to the necessity of providing a trained and capable manpower to the IRIAF.

It trains its students in a numerous variety of subjects and roles related to the air force, such as fighter pilots , UCAV operators, flight & support engineers, radar control, electronics & missile development. Its main departments are a flight school, an aeronautic engineering faculty, an electronic engineering department as well as computing and administrative faculties. The formative period lasts for 4 years. 

Cadets of the academy achieve the second Lieutenant rank upon graduation and join the IRIAF. After that, graduates can take further courses, focusing in their main specialty.  Despite being primarily a military academy for the air force members, the university also trains non-military students in a different variety of fields including electrical, mechanical, and aerospace engineering. Alongside the Israeli Air Force Flight Academy, it is considered one of the best air academies in the region by academic and military standards.

References 

Islamic Republic of Iran Air Force
Shahid Sattari Aeronautical University
Military education and training in Iran
Air force academies
Educational institutions established in 1988
1988 establishments in Iran